Rachel Mackley (born 9 November 1982) is an English broadcaster.

Mackley grew up in Yorkshire and read Fine Art at Newcastle University.

Following university, she worked in public relations in Edinburgh, before embarking on a journalism career in 2007 at Leeds Trinity and All Saints College with the help of an ITV bursary.

After working for 3 years at ITV Anglia, Mackley moved to the BBC in 2011 on South East Today as the weather forecaster.

When the Aegon International tennis tournament returned to Eastbourne in East Sussex to celebrate its 40th anniversary, Mackley took part in a celebrity match on 17 June 2014. 
Prior to the match, she was coached by Leon Smith and presented a short section on the tournament on South East Today.

Personal life
Mackley, her partner Oliver and their children live in London. On 19 February 2016 Rachel fainted live on air. Rachel is keen runner and took part in the Hampton Court Half Marathon 2017

References

External links
Twitter account
 
 
http://www.bbc.co.uk/programmes/profiles/2Zt0fVM6YH42zFxCtPBbn6V/presenters

1982 births
Living people
Alumni of Newcastle University
Alumni of Leeds Trinity University
English meteorologists
BBC weather forecasters